Mimoun Ouled Radi (born 5 June 1977) is a Dutch actor. He was born into a Moroccan family of seven in Amsterdam, Netherlands. He is best known for his role as 'Rachid Boussabon' in the Hush Hush Baby series.

Acting career

2010 Gangsterboys [pre-production]
2006–09 Shouf, Shouf! (Hush Hush), as 'Rachid Boussabon'
2007 Kicks, as 'Nordin'
2006 K3 en het ijsprinsesje (aka: K3 and the Little Ice Princess, as 'Alladin'
2005 Koppensnellers, as 'Marokkaan Mo'
2004 Shouf Shouf Habibi! (Hush Hush Baby), as 'Rachid Boussabon'

Personal life
Mimoun got married in May 2017and he has a daughter named Sofia.

References

External links

1977 births
Living people
Male actors from Amsterdam
Dutch male actors
Dutch people of Moroccan descent